The year 1999 in architecture involved some significant architectural events and new buildings.

Events
 April 19 – The Bundestag holds its first meeting at the Reichstag building in Berlin (following a redesign by Norman Foster) since 1933.

Buildings and structures

Buildings opened

 March – Pero's Bridge in Bristol, England, designed by Eilis O'Connell with Ove Arup & Partners.
 March 6 – Stadium Australia in Sydney, Australia.
 May 3 – The Venetian Las Vegas, United States (casino resort), designed by KlingStubbins.
 September 7 – Black Diamond (library) (part of Royal Danish Library) in Copenhagen, designed by Schmidt Hammer Lassen Architects.
 October – Peggy Notebaert Nature Museum, Chicago, Illinois, designed by Perkins and Will.
 October 8 – The new Embassy of the United States, Ottawa, Canada, designed by David Childs, is dedicated by President Bill Clinton.
 December – Burj al Arab, Dubai, United Arab Emirates.
 December 31
 London Eye, designed by David Marks and Julia Barfield.
 Millennium Dome in London, designed by Richard Rogers.
 Jubilee Line Extension of the London Underground Jubilee line.

Buildings completed

 Burj Al Arab in Dubai, United Arab Emirates, designed by Tom Wright
 March – Main Tower in Frankfurt, Germany.
 Jewish Museum, Berlin, designed by Daniel Libeskind.
 Lille Cathedral in France (Basilica of Notre Dame de la Treille), begun in 1854.
 Palais de Justice de Bordeaux, Bordeaux, France, designed by Richard Rogers Partnership.
 Town Hall extension, Murcia, Spain, by Rafael Moneo.
 Kursaal Congress Centre and Auditorium, San Sebastián, Basque Country, Spain, by Rafael Moneo.
 Great Court of the British Museum, redesigned by Norman Foster.
 Maretas Museum, Lanzarote, designed by Enric Miralles Benedetta Tagliabue.
 Millennium Tower in Vienna, Austria.
 Arthur and Yvonne Boyd Centre, Riversdale, West Cambewarra, New South Wales, Australia, designed by Glenn Murcutt with Reg Lark and Wendy Lewin.
 Conde Nast Building in Manhattan, New York City, United States.
 Lloyd's Register building, London, designed by Richard Rogers Partnership.
 88 Wood Street, London, designed by Richard Rogers Partnership.
 Lord's Media Centre in London by Future Systems.
 Melbourne Museum by architects Denton Corker Marshall, Melbourne, Australia.
 The Lighthouse (Glasgow), a conversion by Page\Park Architects of John Keppie's offices for The Glasgow Herald, opens as Scotland's Centre for Architecture, Design and the City.
 Culture House ("Hagymaház" auditorium), Makó, Hungary, designed by Imre Makovecz.
 Contact Theatre in Manchester, England, rebuilt by Alan Short and Associates.
 Daimler complex (Linkstraße), Potsdamer Platz, Berlin, designed by Richard Rogers Partnership.
 House at La Clota, Barcelona, Catalonia, designed by Benedetta Tagliabue.
 Reconstructed House of the Blackheads in Riga, Latvia.
 Vistet Fritid (vacation cabin) prototype, Sweden, designed by Thomas Sandell and Anders Landström.
 University of Warsaw Library, Poland, by Marek Budzyński.
 Supreme Court of Poland, Poland, by Marek Budzyński.
 Hundertwasser Toilets, Kawakawa, New Zealand, designed by Friedensreich Hundertwasser.

Awards
 AIA Gold Medal – Frank Gehry.
 Architecture Firm Award – Perkins and Will.
 Grand Prix de l'urbanisme – Philippe Panerai and Nathan Starkman.
 Grand prix national de l'architecture – Massimiliano Fuksas.
 Praemium Imperiale Architecture Laureate – Fumihiko Maki
 Pritzker Architecture Prize – Norman Foster.
 Prix de l'Académie d'Architecture de France – Jean Nouvel.
 RAIA Gold Medal – Richard Leplastrier.
 RIBA Royal Gold Medal – Barcelona.
 Stirling Prize – Future Systems, Lord's Media Centre.
 Thomas Jefferson Medal in Architecture – Richard Rogers.
 Twenty-five Year Award – John Hancock Center.

 UIA Gold Medal – Ricardo Legorreta Vilchis.
 Vincent Scully Prize – Vincent Scully.

Deaths
 January 14 – Aldo van Eyck, Dutch Structuralist architect (born 1918)
 January 23 – Jay Pritzker, US entrepreneur, founder of the Pritzker Architecture Prize (born 1922)
 August 15 – Sir Hugh Casson, British architect, interior designer, artist, writer and broadcaster on 20th-century design (born 1910)
 October 3 – Gordon Tait, British architect (born 1912)
 October 27 – Charlotte Perriand, French architect and designer (born 1903)

References

 
20th-century architecture